Lukas Zabulionis (born 6 March 1992 in Lithuania) is a Norwegian saxophonist and composer of Lithuanian origin, residing in Sandefjord, Norway.

Biography 
Zabulionis has lived in Sandefjord since he was 7 years old. After graduation at Sandefjord high school, he attended musical studies at Toneheim Folk High School in 2011. He graduated with a bachelor's degree in jazz performance in 2016 on the Jazzl program, the department of Jazz at Norwegian University of Science and Technology in Trondheim (NTNU).

Zabulionis received attention for his debut album Changing Tides (2016). Additional musicians are Ivan Blomqvist (piano), Arne Martin Nybo (guitar), Kristian B. Jacobsen (bass), and Per Kamfjord (drums). The music is inspired by ECM's contemporary jazz aesthetics from the 1970s and are linked to the work of Jan Garbarek. The thinking behind the release can also be linked to ideas that originated in the romanticism in the 1800s, where the music is marked by longing, mystery and love with great emphasis on colors and contrasts.

Discography 
2016: Changing Tides (Curling Legs)

References

External links 

21st-century Norwegian saxophonists
Norwegian jazz saxophonists
Norwegian jazz composers
Musicians from Sandefjord
Norwegian University of Science and Technology alumni
Curling Legs artists
1992 births
Living people